Pietro Marzorati (Milan, 1829 - Milan, 1895) was an Italian painter, mainly painting land- and sea-scapes.

Biography
He studied at the Brera Academy under professor Giuseppe Bisi and in 1852, he won a gold medal at the annual contest of the Accademia of Venice. In 1875, he won the second prize at the Internazional Exhibition of Santiago, Chile, and in 1876 he was made honorary associate of the Academy of Fine Arts of Milan.

References

1829 births
1895 deaths
Brera Academy alumni
19th-century Italian painters
Italian male painters
Italian landscape painters
Painters from Milan
19th-century Italian male artists